Arthur O'Hara Wood defeated Gerald Patterson 6–4, 6–3, 5–7, 6–1 in the final to win the men's singles tennis title at the 1914 Australasian Championships.

Draw

Key
 Q = Qualifier
 WC = Wild card
 LL = Lucky loser
 r = Retired

Top half

Bottom half

References 
  Grand Slam Tennis Archive – Australasian Open 1914
 

1914 in Australian tennis
Singles